Mate Ta Love Helare is a 2008 Indian Odia-language action comedy film directed by Ashok Pati. This film is loose remake of Telugu Movie Student No. 1 starring Jr NTR.

Synopsis 
The hero Akash believes in high thinking. He has a lot of dreams and he is very serious for his studies because he wants to bring a bright future for his mother and sister. Akash meets his love megha at the college. But all his dreams come to a dark side after he enters college. Akash falls into the trap laid by Mafia don Bhalu Bhai and his brother King. And the story of "Mate Ta Love Helare" moves around how Akash comes out of the trap and punish the don and how he gets his love.

Cast
Siddhanta Mahapatra- Bhalu Bhai
Anuvab Mohanty- Akash
Subhashree Ganguly- Megha
Bijoy Mohanty
Mihir Das
Bobby Mishra
Satwaki Mishra
Illu Banarjee
Anita Das
Puspa Panda
Pintu Nanda
Twinkil

Reception  
The movie was made on a very high budget and was technically a very well made movie. Though the movie had a lot of graphics and could attract youth but still since the movie was released in an off season (at the time of exams) the film could not do the kind of business as it was expected. The movie got just a more than average response at the box office.

References

External links 
 

2008 films
Odia remakes of Telugu films
2000s Odia-language films
Films directed by Ashok Pati